Paul Bley/NHØP is a jazz duet album by Paul Bley and Niels-Henning Ørsted Pedersen, released on SteepleChase Records in 1973.  The album was recorded in Copenhagen, Denmark in June and July 1973, and primarily features Bley's compositions.  Bley's performance here is more extroverted than on some of his other recordings.

Reception

The Allmusic review awarded the album 4 stars calling it a "glorious, heady, and intimate album".

Track listing
All compositions by Paul Bley except as indicated
 "Meeting" - 6:03
 "Mating of Urgency" - 4:51
 "Carla" - 4:21
 "Olhos de Gato" (Carla Bley) - 5:33
 "Paradise Island" - 2:20
 "Upstairs" - 3:07
 "Later" - 5:23
 "Summer" - 4:06
 "Gesture Without Plot" (Annette Peacock) - 5:33

Tracks 1-3 and 7-9 recorded on June 24, 1973. Tracks 4-6 recorded on July 1, 1973.

Personnel
Paul Bley: piano
Niels-Henning Ørsted Pedersen: bass

References

1973 albums
Instrumental duet albums
SteepleChase Records albums
Paul Bley albums
Niels-Henning Ørsted Pedersen albums